Sophie Quinton (born 31 August 1976) is a French actress. She has played in a number of short films directed by Gérald Hustache-Mathieu, and starred in the 2003 film Who Killed Bambi?.

Life and career
Born into a farming family in Villedieu-les-Poêles, Lower Normandy, Sophie Quinton studied drama at the Millet high school in Cherbourg. The films Peau d' Ane and La nuit americaine inspired her love of cinema. After leaving school, Quinton joined a small street-theatre group.

She first came to the attention of critics in two short films by Gerald Hustache-Mathieu: Peau de Vache (for which she won the award for Best Performance at the Clermont-Ferrand Festival) and La Chatte Andalouse.

Quinton was introduced to a wider audience when she played the heroine in Qui a tué Bambi ? which earned her a César nomination for Most Promising Newcomer. 

In 2005 she joined forces with Gérald Hustache-Mathieu for his first feature film, Avril.

Sophie Quinton has two sons.

Selected filmography

Awards and nominations

References

External links

1976 births
Living people
French film actresses
People from Manche
21st-century French actresses